Purma Bannerjee (born 1897, date of death unknown) was an Indian sprinter. He competed in the men's 100 metres at the 1920 Summer Olympics. Purma was India's first olympian to be the flag-bearer for the Indian contingent at the 1920 Olympics held in Antwerp, Belgium.

References

External links
 

1897 births
Year of death missing
Athletes from Kolkata
Athletes (track and field) at the 1920 Summer Olympics
Indian male sprinters
Olympic athletes of India